Pravda is a village in Northern Bulgaria. The village is a part of Gorna Oryahovitsa Municipality, Veliko Tarnovo Province. Counted by the 2020 Bulgarian census, Pravda currently has a population of 572 people with a permanent address registration in the settlement.

Geography 
Pravda takes part in Gorna Oryahovitsa Municipality and is located at an elevation of 92 meters. The village exists in its current location (On the left shore of the Yantra River) since 1897.

Culture 
In 1952 the name of the village was changed to Pravda from Tsiganovo. The first known written text that mentions the village dates back to the year 1415.

The roads in the village are straight and asphalted. There are two large agricultural facilities that are still operational in the field of seeds production.

The total number of households in the village is around 400.

Buildings 
During the period after the merger of the two villages Sergyuvets and Teminsko, Parvomaytsi flourishes as a settlement. Most buildings were built during that time.

 In 1905, the community hall and library “Zvezda 1905” was built. It is still acting.

Ethnicity 
According to the Bulgarian population census in 2011.

References 

Villages in Veliko Tarnovo Province